Space Riders is a 1984 British sports drama film directed by Joe Massot. It stars Grand Prix motorcycle racing world champion Barry Sheene as himself. It tells the story of Sheene's pursuit of the world title, including his recovery from a near-fatal accident at Silverstone.

Plot
The film begins with Barry having a bad crash during the 1982 British Grand Prix. Suzuki rider Anton Mang crashes and Barry crashes into his bike. Barry is then hit by Honda rider Takazumi Katayama. One year later, chairman Asama Nakamura of Asama Motorbikes decides to hire the three fastest riders in the world to race for them. He ends up hiring Barry, who now has metal pins in his legs, American Ron Harris, who won the '82 title after Barry crashed, and Japanese rider Masao Yamashta.

Leading up to the race, Masao practices Japanese stick fighting and talks to his wife Mika. Ron rides on his 1983 Honda VF750F and meets a girl driving a 1978 Porsche 911 SC Targa. The two end up dating for about a week until she friend zones him. Some time later, the British Grand Prix begins and Barry ends up winning ahead of Ron and his archenemy Mike Lockwood.  Soon the sidecar race begins, and Mika and her passenger Bruce win. Some time later, the South African Grand Prix begins. Masao wins ahead of Lockwood and Ron, with Barry dropping out after his bike has ignition trouble. As time passes, Barry wins Brazil, Ron wins Spain and Daytona, Lockwood wins Germany,  Masao wins France, Ron wins the Dutch Grand Prix, Lockwood beats Masao in a photo finish at Sweden after Barry drops out after his transmission seizes, and Lockwood wins at Italy after Barry crashes.

Masao finds out there will only be two bikes for next season. In a desperate attempt to renew his contract, he wins Argentina and Venezuela. Masao takes the lead in Yugoslavia until he has visions of the devil on Lockwood's bike. His life flashes before his eyes, causing him to become airborne and his bike to explode. He goes flying through the air on fire and dies. After his wife Mika deals with the crash by doing wheelies up and down the pit lane while sobbing uncontrollably, the San Marino Grand Prix begins. Barry wins with Ron second and Lockwood dropping out after his bike throws a connecting rod. Barry and Ron celebrate on the podium drinking champagne, and Barry is interviewed about his win by ABC Sports.

Cast
 Barry Sheene as himself
 Gavan O'Herlihy as Ron Harris
 Toshiya Ito as Masao Yamashta
 Stephanie McLean as Stephanie
 Sayo Inaba as Mika Yamashta
 Caroline Evans as Joanne
 Jeff Harding as Mike Lockwood
 Marina Sirtis as Girl in Porsche
 Hiroshi Kato as Chairman
 Three Japanese executives
 Akira
 Isamu
 Sakamoto
 Two Japanese secretaries
 Maria
 Yuriko
 Nightclub fight scene singers 
 Geraldine
 Maureen
 Teresa
 Steve Parrish as Devil Rider
 Ken Fletcher as Barry's mechanic
 Andrew Marriot as Commentator
 Roald Knutsen as Kendo Master
 Stunt riders 
 Stu Avant
 Wayne Gardner
 Chris Guy
 Ron Haslam
 Steve Henshaw
 Keith Huewen
 Paul Lewis
 Rob McElnea
 Roger Marshall
 Steve Parrish
 Mark Salle
 Franco Uncini
 Boet van Dulmen
 Loris Reggiani
 Freddie Spencer
 Marco Lucchinelli
 Takazumi Katayama
 Kenny Roberts
 Carlos Lavado
 Eddie Lawson
 Randy Mamola
 Anton Mang
 Barry Sheene
 Terry Haslam (Bruce)

Production
A re-enactment of the accident is the opening scene of the movie. Despite his position atop the marquee, Sheene does not appear in about 80% of the film's footage.

Much of the filming of the race sequences with Barry Sheene took place at Donington Park race circuit close to East Midlands Airport. Many of the stunts were arranged by Stunt coordinator Roy Alon.

Soundtrack
The film uses hit songs from the era as narration; songs such as "Don't Stop Me Now" by Queen, "Glittering Prize" by Simple Minds, "Hungry Like the Wolf" by Duran Duran, "Love Comin' At Ya" by Melba Moore, "Outside" by The Fixx, "Reggae High" by The Dub Band, and "We Can Work It Out" by Brass Construction are used to add to the mood.

Home media
Space Riders was released on VHS. As of 2021, it has not been released on DVD or Blu-ray.

See also
 Silver Dream Racer

References

External links
 

1984 films
1980s biographical drama films
1980s sports drama films
British auto racing films
British biographical drama films
British sports drama films
Films shot in Kent
Films shot in Italy
Films shot in London
Motorcycle racing films
Films directed by Joe Massot
1984 drama films
1980s English-language films
1980s British films